LackeyCCG is a computer program used to play virtually any collectible card game (CCG) against online opponents or for building and testing of CCG decks offline in a solitaire mode.  It also allows for the searching of cards within each CCG.  LackeyCCG currently has Mac, Windows and Linux versions (It has also been reported to be stable on Linux via Wine.). The program was created by Trevor Agnitti and is currently in its beta testing stage.

Plugins
Using LackeyCCG a person may play games such as Call of Cthulhu, Yu-Gi-Oh!, Pokémon and Magic: The Gathering.  Players may create a plugin for use with LackeyCCG representing any CCG.  Unlike programs such as Apprentice, LackeyCCG stores the card art for each card in the plugin.  This is done so players may easily and quickly recognize cards being played.  In addition LackeyCCG saves disc space and increases download speeds by using only one card image for each card, instead of four or more as programs such as CCG Workshop do.  After installing or creating a desired plugin, players may also add additional plugins and may switch between the plugins to play different CCG's.

For copyright reasons, LackeyCCG does not come with any plugins aside from a basic plugin which shows users a template for making their own plugin, but users have shared the plugins they have made.

Independent CCG Plugins
The LackeyCCG software is also being used to develop a number of independent games, including Duality and Realms at War. Other plugins, while not on LackeyCCG, are being developed and are pending release, at various stages of completion.

Gameplay
Players may connect with one another using an IP address or by using a server associated with LackeyCCG.  Since LackeyCCG will accommodate multiple CCG's, it does not come with a rules engine.  As such, players are responsible for keeping track of any point totals and moving all cards to the appropriate playing zones. Lackey has included many tools for tracking health, turns, and phases within each turn.

Through the use of forums players can organize everything from one time sit down games all the way up to tournaments.  The use of the Lackey Forums can aid in tracking games as well as finding new people to play with.

Recently, Card Arena, a league site supporting Lackey, was released allowing for organized play in ladders and tournaments using the LackeyCCG program.

Currently all LackeyCCG versions are free programs, but the designer has plans to make a premium version in addition to the free version.

List of Plugins
Following is a list of all the plugins for LackeyCCG shared by users.

Aliens vs. Predator Collectible Card Game
Anachronism
Arkham Horror: The Card Game
Babylon 5 CCG
Battlestar Galactica CCG
BattleTech CCG
Beyblade Trading Card Game
Bleach TCG
Blue Moon CG
Case Closed TCG
Call of Cthulhu CCG
Dark Eden
Digimon TCG
Digimon CCG Online
Duel Masters TCG
Duality
Epic Battles TCG
Fire Emblem Cipher
Fullmetal Alchemist TCG
Gundam War CCG
Hecatomb TCG
Harry Potter TCG
H4ck3Rs_ TCG
InuYasha TCG
Legend of the Burning Sands
Legend of the Five Rings CCG
Magi-Nation Duel
Magic: The Gathering
MegaMan TCG
THE MIRACLE OF THE ZONE (MOZ) - created by M.H.
Netrunner CG
Pokémon TCG
 Rage CCG White Wolf Get Plugin
Raw Deal collectible card game
Realms At War
Rifts CCG
Shadowrun TCG
Spycraft CCG
Star Trek CCG 2E
Star Wars CCG (Decipher)
Star Wars TCG (Wizards)
Star Wars PocketModel TCG
The Legend of Zelda TCG
The Lord of the Rings TCG
The Spoils
Tomb Raider CCG
Universal Fighting System
Unauthorized Dr. Who CCG
Vampire: The Eternal Struggle
VS System
Warlord: Saga of the Storm CCG
Wheel of Time CCG
World of Warcraft TCG
Yomi: Fighting Card Game
Yu-Gi-Oh!
Zelda

See also 
List of digital collectible card games

References

External links 
 

Collectible card games
Digital collectible card games